The 2006 Reading Borough Council election was held on 4 May 2006, at the same time as other local elections across England. Seventeen of the 46 seats on Reading Borough Council were up for election, being the usual third of the council plus two by-elections. The by-election in Southcote ward was caused by the resignation of Labour councillor Christopher Swaine, and the by-election in Thames was caused by the resignation of Conservative councillor Rob Wilson, who had been elected as the member of parliament for Reading East the previous year. Labour lost three seats at the election: two to the Conservatives and one to the Liberal Democrats. The Conservatives took the largest number of votes across the borough for the first time since 1992. Despite these losses, Labour remained in control of the council, with David Sutton continuing as leader of the party and the council.

Results

Ward results
The results in each ward were as follows (candidates with an asterisk* were the sitting councillor standing for re-election):

References

2006 English local elections
2006